The PFL 5 mixed martial arts event for the 2021 season of the Professional Fighters League was held on June 17, 2021. This was the second regular season event of the tournament and included fights in the Welterweight and Light heavyweight divisions.

Background
The event was headlined by a welterweight clash between the former UFC title contender and Bellator welterweight champion Rory MacDonald and the former UFC veteran Gleison Tibau.

In the co-main event, the 2019 PFL Welterweight tournament winner Ray Cooper III faced Nikolay Aleksakhin.

The remaining two fights of the main card featured Cezar Ferreira against Chris Camozzi in the Light Heavyweight division, and 2019 PFL Light Heavyweight tournament winner Emiliano Sordi facing former UFC and Bellator fighter Daniel Spohn. 

At weigh-ins, Ray Cooper III weighed in at 171.8 pounds, missing weight by .8 pounds. He was fined 20 percent of his purse, deemed ineligible to win playoff points, given a walkover loss, and was penalized one point in the standings. Nikolay Aleksakhin received a walkover win regardless of bout outcome but is eligible to gain stoppage points.

Results

Standings After Event
The PFL points system is based on results of the match.  The winner of a fight receives 3 points.  If the fight ends in a draw, both fighters will receive 1 point. The bonus for winning a fight in the first, second, or third round is 3 points, 2 points, and 1 point respectively. The bonus for winning in the third round requires a fight be stopped before 4:59 of the third round.  No bonus point will be awarded if a fighter wins via decision.  For example, if a fighter wins a fight in the first round, then the fighter will receive 6 total points. A decision win will result in three total points.  If a fighter misses weight, the opponent (should they comply with weight limits) will receive 3 points due to a walkover victory, regardless of winning or losing the bout, with the fighter who missed weight being deducted 1 standings point;  if the non-offending fighter subsequently wins with a stoppage, all bonus points will be awarded. A fighter who was unable to compete for any reason, will receive a 1-point penalty (-1 point in the standings). The fighters who made weight will not receive a walkover, but will earn points and contracted purse amounts based on their performance in the altered matchup.

Light heavyweight

♛ = Clinched playoff spot ---
E = Eliminated

Welterweight

See also
List of PFL events
List of current PFL fighters

References

Professional Fighters League
2021 in mixed martial arts
June 2021 sports events in the United States
Events in Atlantic City, New Jersey